William Strickland (17 August 1864 – 24 November 1959) was an Australian rules footballer who played for Collingwood in the inaugural Victorian Football League (VFL) season.

Strickland was a centreman and started his career with Brunswick before joining Victorian Football Association side Carlton in 1885, playing in their 1887 premiership side. He missed the 1889 season after rolling his ankle in a practice match, but returned in 1890 as club captain.

He would cross to new team Collingwood at the end of 1892 due to internal dissent and dissatisfaction at Carlton. After arriving at Collingwood, he became the club's captain, and in 1896 led the club to the VFA premiership after they defeated South Melbourne in a premiership play-off.

In 1897, he was Collingwood's first ever VFL captain, and also played his 200th career match, leading them to third place before retiring.

He returned to the VFL in 1904 as coach, and again briefly in 1908. He was also involved in Sydney Australian rules football for many years.

Notes

Holmesby, Russell and Main, Jim (2007). The Encyclopedia of AFL Footballers. 7th ed. Melbourne: Bas Publishing.
Blueseum biography

1864 births
Carlton Football Club (VFA) players
Collingwood Football Club players
Collingwood Football Club coaches
Brunswick Football Club players
1959 deaths
Australian rules footballers from Victoria (Australia)